Obregón or Obregon may refer to:

People
Obregon (surname)
Álvaro Obregón, former President of Mexico (1920 - 1924)

Sports
Obregón F.C., Mexican football club

Places

Obregon, California, in Imperial County
Álvaro Obregón, D.F., in the Mexican Federal District
Ciudad Obregón, in the Mexican state of Sonora
Progreso de Álvaro Obregón, in the state of Hidalgo
Cañadas de Obregón, in the state of Jalisco
Tekax de Álvaro Obregón, in the state of Yucatán
Álvaro Obregón, Michoacán

Pistol
 The Obregon (pistol), designed by Alejandro Obregón

Comic Book Character
Obregon Kaine, CrossGen comics character; featured in the Negation series